Leandria momordicae is an ascomycete fungus that is a plant pathogen.

References

External links 
 Index Fungorum
 USDA ARS Fungal Database

Fungal plant pathogens and diseases
Ascomycota enigmatic taxa